The Tanner Cup is a New Zealand youth inter-provincial sailing competition. One under 17 year old sailor from each region competes in P Class yachts.

The competition is named after George Tanner, who donated the trophy, and was first sailed in 1945. Many of New Zealand's top sailors have competed in and won the Tanner Cup, including Russell Coutts, Dean Barker, Adam Minoprio and Jo Aleh.

The national open P Class competition for the Tauranga Cup is normally sailed at the same venue.

List of winners

References

Recurring sporting events established in 1945
Sailing competitions in New Zealand